The 1944 Chicago Cubs season was the 73rd season of the Chicago Cubs franchise, the 69th in the National League and the 29th at Wrigley Field. The Cubs finished fourth in the National League with a record of 75–79.

Offseason 
 Prior to 1944 season (exact date unknown)
 Smoky Burgess was signed as an amateur free agent by the Cubs.
 Jim Pearce was signed as an amateur free agent by the Cubs.

Regular season

Season standings

Record vs. opponents

Notable transactions 
 June 6, 1944: Eddie Stanky was traded by the Cubs to the Brooklyn Dodgers for Bob Chipman.
 July 5, 1944: Jimmie Foxx was released by the Cubs.

Roster

Player stats

Batting

Starters by position 
Note: Pos = Position; G = Games played; AB = At bats; H = Hits; Avg. = Batting average; HR = Home runs; RBI = Runs batted in

Other batters 
Note: G = Games played; AB = At bats; H = Hits; Avg. = Batting average; HR = Home runs; RBI = Runs batted in

Pitching

Starting pitchers 
Note: G = Games pitched; IP = Innings pitched; W = Wins; L = Losses; ERA = Earned run average; SO = Strikeouts

Other pitchers 
Note: G = Games pitched; IP = Innings pitched; W = Wins; L = Losses; ERA = Earned run average; SO = Strikeouts

Relief pitchers 
Note: G = Games pitched; W = Wins; L = Losses; SV = Saves; ERA = Earned run average; SO = Strikeouts

Farm system 

LEAGUE CHAMPIONS: Nashville

References

External links
1944 Chicago Cubs season at Baseball Reference

Chicago Cubs seasons
Chicago Cubs season
Chicago Cubs